The 1982 Southwest Texas State Bobcats football team was an American football team that represented Southwest Texas State University—now known as Texas State University–as a member of the Lone Star Conference (LSC) during the 1982 NCAA Division II football season. Led by fourth-year head coach Jim Wacker, Southwest Texas State compiled an overall record of 14–0 and claimed the LSC title with a conference mark of 7–0. They won their second consecutive NCAA Division II Football Championship with a win over UC Davis, 34–9, in the Palm Bowl.

Schedule

References

Southwest Texas
Texas State Bobcats football seasons
NCAA Division II Football Champions
Lone Star Conference football champion seasons
College football undefeated seasons
Southwest